Flying Dust 105F is an Indian reserve of the Flying Dust First Nation in Saskatchewan.

References

Indian reserves in Saskatchewan
Division No. 17, Saskatchewan